Kuzyaka (also known as Karasüver) is a village in the Kangal district of Sivas Province, Turkey. It is 35 km away from the central town of Kangal.

References
https://web.archive.org/web/20090628101332/http://www.earthsearch.net/featureIndex.php?type=int&start=2610000&end=2611000
https://web.archive.org/web/20070628234601/http://plasma.nationalgeographic.com/mapmachine/
http://www.fallingrain.com/world/TU/58/Kuzyaka.html

External links
 Karasuver Village's Official Website 
 Kuzyaka Village's Wikipedia Turkish Page

Villages in Kangal District